Raphael Obermair (born 1 April 1996) is a German professional footballer who plays as a defensive midfielder or a right back for 2. Bundesliga club Paderborn 07.

Club career

Youth
Obermair was born in Prien am Chiemsee, Bavaria, He had his youth at TSV 1860 Rosenheim.

TSV 1860 Rosenheim
In 2014, Obermair was promoted to the first team of TSV 1860 Rosenheim. He made a total of 84 games scoring 4 goals in his two-year spell with the senior team.

Bayern Munich II
In 2016, Obermair joined the second team of Bundesliga club Bayern Munich.

Sturm Graz
In 2018, Obermair signed a two-year deal with Austrian Bundesliga club Sturm Graz.

Carl Zeiss Jena
In August 2019, Obermair signed a two-year contract with 3. Liga club Carl Zeiss Jena, joining the club on a free transfer. He scored his first and only goal for Carl Zeiss Jena in a 3-2 away defeat against Chemnitzer FC. In June 2020, after playing for one season, it was announced that Obermair have left the club.

Magdeburg
In summer of 2020, Obermair joined 3. Liga club Magdeburg on a free transfer, signing a deal until June 2022. Magdeburg have won the 2021–22 3. Liga title and were promoted to 2. Bundesliga for the 2022–23 season.

Paderborn
In 2022, it was announced that Obermair have joined 2. Bundesliga club Paderborn on a free transfer.

International career
Obermair was born and raised in Prien am Chiemsee, Germany to a German father and a Filipino mother, making him eligible to represent either Germany or the Philippines at international level.

Philippines
In May 2021, he was called up to the Philippines for three 2022 FIFA World Cup qualification matches. 

In November 2021, Obermair was once again called-up for the Philippines in 2020 AFF Championship, but was not able to secure a release from his club.

Honours

Club
Magdeburg
 3. Liga: 2021–22

References

External links

1996 births
Living people
People from Rosenheim (district)
Sportspeople from Upper Bavaria
Citizens of the Philippines through descent
German sportspeople of Filipino descent
German footballers
Footballers from Bavaria
Association football midfielders
TSV 1860 Rosenheim players
SK Sturm Graz players
FC Bayern Munich II players
FC Bayern Munich footballers
FC Carl Zeiss Jena players
1. FC Magdeburg players
SC Paderborn 07 players
3. Liga players
Regionalliga players
Austrian Football Bundesliga players
2. Bundesliga players
German expatriate footballers
Expatriate footballers in Austria
German expatriate sportspeople in Austria